Elections were held in the Australian state of Queensland on 12 May 1923 to elect the 72 members of the state's Legislative Assembly. The Labor government was seeking its fourth continuous term in office since the 1915 election; it would be Premier Ted Theodore's second election.

Key dates

Results

|}

 475,957 electors were enrolled to vote at the election, but 2 Country Party seats (Cooroora and Wide Bay), 1 United Party seat (Albert) and 1 Labor seat (Barcoo) were unopposed.

Seats changing party representation

This table lists changes in party representation at the 1923 election.

 Members listed in italics did not recontest their seats.
 The United party member for Bulimba, Walter Barnes instead contested the new seat of Wynnum and won.
 The Country party member for the abolished seat of Drayton, William Bebbington instead contested the seat of Rosewood and lost.
 The United party member for the Kennedy, John Jones instead contested the seat of Queenton and lost.
 The Country party member for the abolished seat of Musgrave, Henry Cattermull instead contested the seat of Bundaberg and lost.
 The Independent Country party member for the abolished seat of Pittsworth, Cecil Roberts instead contested the seat of Cunningham and lost.

See also
 Members of the Queensland Legislative Assembly, 1920–1923
 Members of the Queensland Legislative Assembly, 1923–1926
 Candidates of the Queensland state election, 1923
 Theodore Ministry

References

Elections in Queensland
Queensland state election
1920s in Queensland
Queensland state election